Petitiocodon is a monotypic genus of flowering plants belonging to the family Rubiaceae. It only contains one known species, Petitiocodon parviflorum (Keay) Robbr.

It is native to Nigeria and Cameroon.

The genus name of Petitiocodon is in honour of Ernest Marie Antoine Petit (1927–2007), a Belgian professor of botany and botanical garden director. The Latin specific epithet of parviflorum is a portmanteau word made-up of 'parvi-' from parvus meaning small and also '-florum' from flora meaning flower. Both the genus and the species were first described and published in Bull. Jard. Bot. Natl. Belg. Vol.58 on page 116–119 in 1988.

References

Rubiaceae
Rubiaceae genera
Plants described in 1988
Flora of Nigeria
Flora of Cameroon